The Music I Like to Play Vol. 2 is a solo album by pianist Tete Montoliu recorded in 1986 and released on the Italian Soul Note label.

Track listing
 "Oleo" (Sonny Rollins) – 3:21
 "Don't Blame Me" (Jimmy McHugh, Dorothy Fields) – 6:29
 "All of You" (Cole Porter) – 5:13
 "Cherokee" (Ray Noble) – 4:29
 "Parker's Mood" (Charlie Parker) – 5:02
 "Softly, as in a Morning Sunrise" (Sigmund Romberg, Oscar Hammerstein II) – 4:35
 "You Go to My Head" (J. Fred Coots, Haven Gillespie) – 5:17
 "Blues for Nuria" (Tete Montoliu) – 5:05
 "A Child Is Born" (Thad Jones) – 2:04

Personnel
Tete Montoliu – piano

References

Tete Montoliu albums
1989 albums
Black Saint/Soul Note albums
Solo piano jazz albums